The High Performance Wireless Research and Education Network (HPWREN) is a network research program, funded by the National Science Foundation. The program includes the creation, demonstration, and evaluation of a non-commercial, prototype, high-performance, wide-area, wireless network in its Southern California service area.

The HPWREN program is a collaborative, interdisciplinary and multi-institutional cyber-infrastructure for research and education purposes. The program also provides data, and data transmission capabilities, to emergency first responders in its service area.

Network
The program includes the creation, demonstration, and evaluation of a non-commercial, prototype, high-performance, wide-area, wireless network in its service area. Currently, the HPWREN network is used for network analysis research, and it also provides high-speed Internet access to field researchers.

Service area
Southern California, specifically San Diego, Riverside, and Imperial counties.

Backbone nodes
The network includes backbone nodes located at the University of California San Diego (UCSD) and San Diego State University (SDSU) campuses, as well as a number of “hard-to-reach” areas in remote environments.

Operations
The HPWREN backbone itself operates primarily in the licensed spectrum and project researchers use off-the-shelf technology to create a redundant topology. Access links often utilize license-exempt radios.

In 2002, HPWREN researchers conducted an expedition to locate the SEALAB II/III habitat located off the Scripps pier in La Jolla, California. From the MV Kellie Chouest and utilizing a Scorpio ROV to find the site, researchers were able to conduct a live multicast from ship to shore.

Topology
The network spans from the Southern California coast to the inland valleys, on to the high mountains (reaching more than 8700 feet), and out to the remote desert. The network's longest link is 72 miles in distance – reaching from the San Diego Supercomputer Center to San Clemente Island.

See also 
 Mount Laguna Observatory

References

External links
 UCSD HPWREN page
 Wireless Sensor Networks for Ecology A video about high performance wireless research education networks

Wireless networking
University of California, San Diego
San Diego State University
Research organizations in the United States